Hudson Yards is a  real estate development in the area of the same name in Manhattan, New York City, between the Chelsea and Hell's Kitchen neighborhoods. It is located on the waterfront of the Hudson River. Upon completion, 13 of the 16 planned structures on the West Side of Midtown South would sit on a platform built over the West Side Yard, a storage yard for Long Island Rail Road trains (hence the development’s name). The first of its two phases, opened in 2019, comprises a public green space and eight structures that contain residences, a hotel, office buildings, a mall, and a cultural facility. The second phase, on which construction had not started , will include residential space, an office building, and a school.

Related Companies and Oxford Properties are the primary developers and major equity partners in the project. Related, Oxford, and other large investors have funded Hudson Yards' construction from several capital sources, including from foreign investors through the EB-5 investment program. Mitsui Fudosan owns a 92.09 percent stake in 55 Hudson Yards, and a 90 percent stake in 50 Hudson Yards. The architectural firm Kohn Pedersen Fox designed the master plan for the site, and architects including Skidmore, Owings, and Merrill, Thomas Heatherwick, Foster + Partners, Roche-Dinkeloo, and Diller Scofidio + Renfro contributed designs for individual structures. Major office tenants include or will include fashion company Tapestry, consulting firm BCG, the new New York bureau for CNN, and urban planning organization Sidewalk Labs.

The Hudson Yards site was initially intended for other developments, most notably in the early 2000s as the site of the West Side Stadium, during the New York City bid for the 2012 Summer Olympics. Public officials and private investors began developing the new Hudson Yards plan after the failure of the West Side Stadium. Construction began in 2012 with the groundbreaking for 10 Hudson Yards, and the first phase opened on March 15, 2019. Agreements between various entities including the local government, the Metropolitan Transportation Authority (MTA), and the state of New York made the development possible.

The special zoning for Hudson Yards (an area roughly bound by 30th Street in the south, 41st Street in the north, 11th Avenue in the west, and Eighth Avenue in the east) further incentivized the building of other large-scale projects. Hudson Yards is adjacent but unrelated to Manhattan West, 3 Hudson Boulevard, and The Spiral.

Site and structures

The eastern portion of the site, developed as Phase 1, is located between Tenth and Eleventh Avenues. It contains three office towers on Tenth Avenue, two of which have a retail podium between them. Phase 1 also includes The Shed performing arts center, a public plaza, the climbable Vessel sculpture, and three residential skyscrapers on Eleventh Avenue. Developers plan to build Phase 2, the western portion of the development, above tracks between Eleventh and Twelfth Avenues. Phase 2 will provide additional office and residential space.

10 Hudson Yards 

The 52-story,  10 Hudson Yards is located at Tenth Avenue and 30th Street, along the southeastern corner of Phase 1. It opened in 2016. Ground was broken for the building on December 4, 2012. Construction began with 10 Hudson Yards as it was not built over railroad tracks. However, 10 Hudson Yards does straddle the High Line spur to Tenth Avenue. 10 Hudson Yards opened on May 31, 2016, and was the first structure in the Hudson Yards development to be occupied by tenants. Companies with offices in the building include L'Oreal, BCG, Sidewalk Labs, and anchor tenant Coach. Early on during construction, Coach purchased a stake in the building, which was sold back to Related toward the end of construction. Kohn Pedersen Fox designed the building.

15 Hudson Yards

15 Hudson Yards, originally proposed as Tower D, is located on Eleventh Avenue and West 30th Street, near Phase 1's southwestern corner. The building connects to a semi-permanent structure, a performance and arts space known as The Shed. 15 Hudson Yards started construction in December 2014, was topped out in February 2018, and opened in early 2019. When completed, 15 Hudson Yards included 285 residential units. Its original design, with a pronounced "corset" at the middle of the tower's height, attracted attention.  15 Hudson Yards is designed by Diller Scofidio + Renfro, Lead Architect and Rockwell Group, Lead Interior Architect.

Prospective low-income tenants of the building filed a lawsuit against Related. The suit alleges the company created a different address (553 West 30th Street) for 15 Hudson Yards' affordable units and that the tenants of those units would not have access to the same amenities as those in the market-rate units. The suit alleges the building does not have an actual "poor door" but does still segregate its tenants through a "poor address" and "poor floors". "Poor doors" were banned in 2015 by then New York City Mayor Bill de Blasio.

The Shed

The Shed is an arts center housed in the Bloomberg Building, a three-story structure adjacent to 15 Hudson Yards. The space is focused on providing cultural programming, and is maintained by an organization of the same name. Its most prominent feature is a retractable "shell" that wraps around its roof and its northern and southern facades. The Shed opened on April 5, 2019.

30 Hudson Yards

The 103-story, 1,270 feet (387 m) 30 Hudson Yards is located at Tenth Avenue and 33rd Street. It is the city's sixth-tallest building.

An observation deck on the building's 100th floor opened in March 2020.

35 Hudson Yards

35 Hudson Yards is located at Eleventh Avenue and 33rd Street. Construction on the building's foundation was started in January 2015, and it topped out in June 2018. 35 Hudson Yards opened on March 15, 2019. The mixed-use building contains 137 condominiums, an Equinox brand hotel, an Equinox brand gym, medical offices, and retail space. David Childs, the chairman of Skidmore, Owings & Merrill, contributed the designs.

50 Hudson Yards

Work on the -tall 50 Hudson Yards, located at Tenth Avenue between 33rd and 34th Streets, began in May 2018, with construction completed in 2022. Foster + Partners designed the building, which will rank as the fourth largest office tower in New York City in terms of available leaseable area when completed, with  available to lease. Along with 55 Hudson Yards, it is one of two structures in the first phase not located above the rail yard. Mitsui Fudosan owns a 90 percent stake in the building, while Bank of China, Deutsche Bank, and Wells Fargo contributed financing for the tower.

55 Hudson Yards

The  55 Hudson Yards, located at Eleventh Avenue between 33rd and 34th Streets, was designed by Kohn Pedersen Fox and Roche-Dinkeloo. 55 Hudson Yards started construction on January 22, 2015, and topped out in August 2017. Mitsui Fudosan owns a 92.09 percent stake in the building. Like 50 Hudson Yards, 55 is not located over the rail yard, and was not included in the original master plan as created by KPF. Another law firm, Milbank, Tweed, Hadley & McCloy, will occupy . American cryptocurrency trading platform Coinbase has sublet  from Point72 Asset Management in the building.

To lower costs and allow flexibility during the build, construction emphasized the use of concrete over steel. Two architectural firms, Kohn Pederson Fox and Roche Dinkeloo, were involved in the design of the building, which is the first collaborative effort between the two firms.

The Shops & Restaurants at Hudson Yards 

Phase 1 also included a seven-story mall with 100 shops and 20 restaurants, called the Shops & Restaurants at Hudson Yards. It has  of space, including  in retail, including department stores.

In September 2014, Neiman Marcus signed to become the anchor tenant of the Hudson Yards Retail Space. The retail space, designed by Kohn Pedersen Fox and Elkus Manfredi Architects with a connection to the bases of 10 and 30 Hudson Yards, started construction in June 2015, with a  order of steel, one of the largest such orders in the history of the United States. The mall opened on March 15, 2019.

Chef and restaurateur Thomas Keller has opened a restaurant in the complex, in addition to selecting 11 other restaurants in the retail space. There is fine dining on the fifth through seventh floors as well as more casual fare on the second through fourth floors. The mall is anchored by Dior and Chanel on the topmost floors, with "a 'Fifth Avenue' mix of shops", such as H&M, Zara, and Sephora below them. The Neiman Marcus closed in 2020 as part of a plan to close 24 locations nationwide, having been open only for 16 months. The former Neiman Marcus is slated to be converted to office space.

Public plaza 

There is a  public square, with 28,000 plants and 225 trees, on the platform. The public square is a ventilation area for the West Side Yards, as well as a storm water runoff site. Storm water that runs off into the square is reused throughout the development. The entire platform is supported by 234 caissons. The plantings are rooted within "smart soil". The plaza opened along with the mall on March 15, 2019.

Vessel, a permanent art installation designed by Thomas Heatherwick, is located at the center of the plaza. The installation, a 16-story freestanding structure of connected staircases, cost US$150 million. Heatherwick took inspiration from Indian step wells in the design. Stephen M. Ross has compared the structure to the Eiffel Tower, and it has also been informally dubbed The Shawarma. Vessel opened on March 15, 2019. After three suicides at the Vessel, Related closed the structure temporarily in January 2021. Vessel reopened in May 2021, with a rule requiring visitors to come in groups and a new ticket fee for most visitors, but Vessel was closed again in July 2021 after a fourth suicide.  As of August 2022, Hudson Yards officials were installing safety nets around Vessel in preparation for the structure's possible reopening.

Neighboring projects

The Hudson Yards development sits directly west of the second-largest project in the area: Manhattan West, a  mixed-use multi-building development also built above previously exposed rail yards. Two large-scale, single-building office developments border the eastern portion of Hudson Yards. The larger, known as The Spiral, is owned by Tishman Speyer. The smaller development is known as 3 Hudson Boulevard.

Several existing or planned residential buildings border Phase 1. Related owns three: One Hudson Yards and Abington House, and a building under construction at 451 Tenth Avenue. Despite sharing a developer, these buildings are distinct from the main Hudson Yards project.

Another Related development also on the West Side, originally dubbed "Hudson Residences," was under construction at the same time as Hudson Yards. The project consists of two residential buildings, one designed by Thomas Heatherwick, the other by Robert A.M. Stern Architects. The company co-owns a site with Spitzer Enterprises with plans to develop both residential and office space. Related also purchased a 99.9% interest in several sites on 35th and 36th streets from Spitzer in November 2021.

601 West 29th Street and 606 West 30th Street are under construction south of the two Related developments. Despite the involvement of two separate real estate companies, they are being developed together due to their proximity.

Joint ventures with Spitzer Enterprises
In 2020, Spitzer Enterprises and Related Companies received $276 million in loans for a 526-unit housing development in Hudson Yards at 451 10th Avenue. The building, also given the address 455 10th Avenue, will include a mix of "upscale urban senior living communities" and executive apartments. The senior living and executive apartments will respectively be marketed under the brands "The Coterie" and "The Set". Handel Architects designed 451 10th Avenue.

In October 2021, Related purchased 99.9% stakes in three sites owned by Spitzer Enterprises at 511 West 35th Street, 506 West 36th Street, and 512 West 36th Street.

History

Older site proposals
Several developers and other entities proposed uses for the rail yard during the 20th century. In 1956, William Zeckendorf suggested the construction of the "Freedom Tower," which would have risen , making it the tallest building in the world at the time. Transportation to the new complex would have been via a "passenger conveyor belt" from further east in Midtown. Zeckendorf never purchased the rights, as he was unable to secure financing for the deal, given that large-scale speculative real estate projects were not an asset class that institutional investors and lenders took an interest in at the time. The administration of Mayor Robert F. Wagner Jr. released a $670 million development plan in 1963, which was ultimately never realized.

In the 1980s, both the Jets and the Yankees proposed new stadiums above the rails, though none of these projects succeeded. Another ultimately unsuccessful plan for a new stadium for the Yankees was proposed above the West Side Yard in 1993. A similar plan for a Yankee stadium above the West Side Yard was proposed in 1996, and was endorsed by mayor Rudy Giuliani. However, the plan also received opposition from many other public figures, and was also not built. In June 2001, the "Group of 35", a citizens' consortium concerned with the development of New York City real estate, issued a list of recommendations and plans for the city. The "Report of the Group of 35, a Blue Ribbon Task Force on NYC Commercial Space" said that, for New York to compete with other regions and cities for commercial development, a strategy of developing Commercial Business Districts (CBD) should be implemented in Downtown Brooklyn, Long Island City, and "Far West Side" (now Hudson Yards).

By the early 2000s, plans for the rail yard long included a new Olympics stadium, to become the home of the Jets after the games ended. Proposers dubbed the structure the "New York Sports and Convention Center". This effort, led by Daniel Doctoroff, was unpopular with the public and politicians.

In January 2005, the New York City Council approved the 60-block rezoning, including the eastern portion of the West Side Yard. Michael Bloomberg, then the city's mayor, subsequently separated the city's broader rezoning plans from the rail yard stadium. In conjunction with the city, the Metropolitan Transportation Authority (MTA) issued a Request for Proposal (RFP) for a  mixed-use development to be built on platforms over the rail yard, which would remain in use throughout.

The MTA received three bids to cap and lease the rail yard. Cablevision (the owner of the nearby Madison Square Garden), the New York Jets organization, and TransGas Energy all submitted proposals. The Jets won the development rights, but several lawsuits filed after the bidding process alleged they won without paying a fair price. In June 2005, New York State Assembly speaker Sheldon Silver voted against the stadium, definitively eliminating the possibility of support at the state level and the possibility of the stadium's construction. Although Bloomberg and others expressed doubts about interest in the area from real estate companies after the stadium fell through, development nevertheless continued. The former mayor later expressed that the loss of the stadium may have been a "blessing" for New York.

The MTA received proceeds from the development's 2006 bond offering to pay for an extension of the New York City Subway's  to 34th Street–Hudson Yards station. With funding assured, the MTA proceeded quickly to construct the extension. The first construction contracts were awarded in October 2007, and the subway extension opened on September 13, 2015.

Bidding process

In late 2006, the city and the MTA backed out of a plan for the city to purchase the development site, and created a proposal to seek bids from private developers. This was followed by a formal request for proposals in 2008 with the intention of creating a large-scale mixed-use development above the rail yards. Five developers responded to the RFP: Extell Development Company, Tishman Speyer, Brookfield, Vornado Realty Trust with the Durst Organization, and the Related Companies.

Submissions
The buildings would include  of office space and 4,000 residential units, including 400 devoted to affordable housing. "Hudson Place" encompassed the office component covering the eastern portion of the railyards while "Hudson Green" was residential-focused and planned for the western railyards. Individual towers would have been designed by SHoP Architects, SANAA, Thomas Phifer, Handel Architects, and Diller Scofidio + Renfro.

The developers also would have included 12 acres of open space and a subterranean people mover system connecting the complex to Penn Station. Media company Condé Nast agreed to anchor the development by taking all  of office space in the largest office tower and move from their headquarters at Durst's 4 Times Square in 2015.

Extell, in a master plan designed by Steven Holl, proposed 11 towers with just two featuring office space and the rest devoted to 3,812 residential units. The company's proposal also featured 19.5 acres of outdoor space including an outdoor amphitheatre and a sculpture garden named after Sol LeWitt. The company also would have built a new ferry terminal on the Hudson River as well as a Long Island Rail Road stop at the site. Extell's proposal was fundamentally different than the others as they proposed constructing a suspension deck over the rail yards similar to a suspension bridge rather than the truss structure every other developer proposed. Extell claimed this method would be more cost-effective but the suspension structure also would not have been strong enough to support large buildings. Due to this, all of Extell's proposed towers were clustered at the edges of the site in order to sit on solid ground while the deck itself would hold only the proposal's open spaces and park. Other unique aspects included a central reservoir to collect stormwater, a geothermal cooling system, and cogeneration which together would reduce energy use by almost 50%. Writing in The Wall Street Journal, Ada Louise Huxtable praised the proposal, writing that it "could have the unity, character and potential beauty of a Rockefeller Center." The New York Times added to the praise, writing that the "proposal is the only one worth serious consideration."

Related's initial proposal envisioned 13 towers split between 3 office building and 10 residential structures. Proposed amenities included a school, winter garden, and 15.1 acres of open space. Related also secured a commitment from Rupert Murdoch's News Corporation to move their headquarters into one of the new office towers at the development. However, News Corporation later pulled out of the deal which led Related to bid only on the residential-focused Western railyard rather than the entire site. Due to this, the MTA disqualified the Related bid.

Tishman Speyer's bid, designed by Helmut Jahn, covered 11 towers centered on four large office towers surrounded by seven smaller residential buildings. The company's bid was the most office-focused with plans featuring  of commercial space and 3,000 residential units. Investment bank Morgan Stanley would have occupied all  of office space in both the taller office towers as the company's headquarters and also would have provided equity and debt financing for the project.

Selection
Tishman Speyer, a New York-based real estate conglomerate, won the bid in March 2008. Tishman Speyer won a $1 billion bid to lease and cap the West Side Yard, with payment due as annual rent over a 99-year period. It would also spend another $2 billion for development over the rail yards, including for the two platforms over the yards to support  of public spaces, four office buildings, and ten high-rise residential towers. Tishman had secured the investment bank Morgan Stanley as both an anchor tenant and financial backer.

Two months later, the deal broke down when Morgan Stanley pulled out due to the late-2000s financial crisis. Subsequently, the MTA chose the Related Companies and Goldman Sachs to develop Hudson Yards under the same conditions. Related's revised plan included 13 buildings encompassing 12 million square feet of space including 2,154 rental apartments, 20% of which would be affordable.

In December 2009, the New York City Council approved Related Companies' revised plan for Hudson Yards, and the western portion of the West Side Yard was rezoned. Following the rail yards' successful rezoning, the MTA signed another 99-year lease to the air rights over the rail yard in May 2010. The air rights were signed over to a joint venture of Related Companies and Oxford Properties Group, which invested $400 million to build a platform above both the eastern and western portions of the yard on which to construct the buildings.

In April 2013, the Related/Oxford joint venture obtained a $475 million construction loan from parties including Barry Sternlicht's Starwood Capital Group and luxury retailer Coach. The financing deal was unique in several aspects, including the fact that it included a construction mezzanine loan, that Coach was a lender on both the debt and equity sides, and that the MTA reused a "severable lease" structure (previously used by Battery Park City) that allowed for the loans. A portion of the project was also financed by the EB-5 investment program, which uses capital from immigrants, who become eligible for a green card.

Construction and opening

The groundbreaking for 10 Hudson Yards, which was not built on the platform, occurred on December 4, 2012. At that event, the start of construction was also announced for 30 Hudson Yards. No tenants had been secured for any building in the complex when construction started on 10 Hudson Yards. However, three tenants—L'Oreal, Coach, and SAP—were announced in 2013.

In October 2013, New York's Industrial Development Agency granted Related a $328 million tax exemption for 20 and 30 Hudson Yards, in addition to the previously approved $106 million exemption for 10 Hudson Yards. Shortly after, Related announced construction would begin on the platform covering the eastern railyards in January 2014 and cost $721 million. Construction on the platform began in March 2014 after Related secured a $250 million loan from Deutsche Bank. The erection of the platform was necessary in order to start construction on 15, 30, and 35 Hudson Yards. The platform for the Eastern Rail Yard was completed in October 2015, and the western platform was completed by 2016. In anticipation of the completion of the structures at Hudson Yards, the section of the High Line elevated park adjacent to the development opened in September 2014. After several delays in the completion of the 34th Street subway station, the station opened the following September. However, the first building in the complex, 10 Hudson Yards, did not open until May 31, 2016.

Groundbreaking occurred for 15 Hudson Yards in December 2014, and work on 35 Hudson Yards and 55 Hudson Yards both started the following month. Construction on The Shed, adjacent to 15 Hudson Yards, began in mid-2015 after its pilings were completed. A 16-story, honeycomb-shaped structure with stairwells named Vessel, in the center of Hudson Yards' public plaza, was unveiled to the public in September 2016. The pieces of Vessel were fabricated off-site and were brought to Hudson Yards for assembly starting in April 2017. Work on the final building in the first phase, 50 Hudson Yards, began in May 2018.

55 Hudson Yards topped out in August 2017, while 15, 30, and 35 Hudson Yards all topped out in 2018. All four structures were opened on March 14, 2019, as were the Shed, shopping center, and Vessel. In addition, neither the High Line nor the 34th Street station were completed at the time of their respective openings. A second entrance to the 34th Street station was opened in September 2018, while the High Line spur adjacent to 10 Hudson Yards opened in June 2019.

Labor disputes
Higher costs for materials and land after the 2008 recession have caused real estate companies to seek lower labor costs. In New York City non-union labor has made inroads, although workers tend to have less training and experience. Douglas Durst, a real estate magnate in New York, has said "Related is leading the charge" among New York-based companies in employing non-union labor. Beginning in late 2017, unions working at the site alleged Related "continue[d] to look for deeper and deeper concessions" in their negotiations, and begin organizing a campaign referred to as "#CountMeIn". Related's push to change the site to an open shop would mostly affect the second phase of construction, on the western yard. The labor dispute is ongoing , though there have been meetings between labor leader Gary LaBarbera and Related executive Bruce Beal Jr.

COVID-19 pandemic

The Edge observation deck on the 100th floor of 30 Hudson Yards had opened on March 11, 2020, but the onset of the COVID-19 pandemic in New York City caused Related to close Edge two days later. The restaurant on the 101st floor of the same building, Peak, also opened on March 11 but closed the following day after a staff member contracted COVID-19. In April 2020, The Wall Street Journal reported that condominium sales had slowed due to the pandemic. The Journal also noted a downturn in retail rent collections at the development. This decline occurred in part due to unique contracts between Related and its tenants, which meant the developer collected income based on sales, rather than traditional fixed payments. In May 2020, the Financial Times noted the development had become a "ghost town".

The Wall Street Journal reported in July that the Hudson Yards Neiman Marcus location, the flagship of the development's retail offerings, would close. Related opted to turn the Neiman Marcus store into offices instead of a store. Thomas Keller closed his restaurant in the complex in August 2020. The Hudson Yards mall reopened in September 2020, though Bloomberg noted few visitors. The Edge observation deck also reopened that month. Despite the closures, Barclays reportedly considered Hudson Yards as a location for a new American headquarters in late 2020. Additionally, BlackRock indicated in early 2021 that it still intended to move its headquarters to 50 Hudson Yards in 2022 or 2023. Due to the financial problems caused by the pandemic, Related has sought a low-interest loan from the Department of Transportation to cap the western yard, the first step in beginning the project's second phase.

Vendor disputes
Street vendors who have legally operated on public property near the development since before its opening allege they have been the targets of harassment from security employed by Related and the NYPD. Related has installed landscaping with the alleged intention of depriving the vendors of adequate space to place their carts. Related first installed new tree pits, leaving space for one cart, and later placed a large planter in the final available space.

After receiving summonses from NYPD officers in May 2021—contravening a policy removing police from enforcing vendor compliance with laws—the vendors organized a protest. This protest was supported by Manhattan Borough President Gale Brewer.

Future development

The western portion of the yard is bordered by 30th Street and 33rd Street in the north and south, and Eleventh and Twelfth avenues in the east and west. The western phase of the project is to contain up to seven residential towers, an office building at 33rd Street and Eleventh Avenue tentatively known as "West Tower", and a school serving Pre-K to eighth grade students. The third phase of the High Line will traverse Phase 2 of the project. According to Architectural Digest magazine, Santiago Calatrava, Robert A.M. Stern Architects, Thomas Heatherwick, and Frank Gehry are involved in the design of the second phase's residential towers. Related Companies had previously commissioned works from Stern, Heatherwick, and Gehry.

Work on the platform to cover the second half of the tracks was originally scheduled to begin in 2018, and Phase 2 was to have been completed by 2024. However, construction was later rescheduled to begin in 2019. Around $500 million of financing for Phase 2 was approved in mid-2018. , there is no set completion date for Phase 2 because of the COVID-19 pandemic.

The status of the plans for buildings with a range of uses on the western yard is unclear. In late 2022, multiple sources reported that Related had entered into a partnership with Wynn Resorts to attempt develop a casino and resort on the western yard, presumably replacing earlier plans. This plan would require that the partnership secure one of several available licenses, issued by New York state, for casinos in New York City and its surroundings. Competitors for the licenses include a joint venture between SL Green Realty and Caesars Entertainment, Soloviev Group, and other bidders. Related has also entered into discussion with representatives of Madison Square Garden about moving the sporting and entertainment facility to the development.

Rail yard platform

The new platform upon which the Hudson Yards development is being built is bordered by 10th and 12th Avenues and by 30th and 33rd Streets. In 2014, it was expected to cost more than $20 billion and was projected to eventually see 65,000 visitors a day. Construction on the platform began in March 2014. Construction was overseen by Related Companies' executive vice president, Timur Galen.

The  Hudson Yards project is located in the Hudson Yards area of Manhattan, between the Chelsea and Hell's Kitchen neighborhoods. It was constructed over the existing at-grade West Side Yard, allowing LIRR trains to continue to be stored during midday hours. To minimize construction impact on the LIRR's ability to store trains during midday and peak hours, caissons were drilled into bedrock throughout much of the site, over which the platform was to be built. However, only 38% of the ground level at West Side Yard was to be filled in with columns to support the development. Much of the platform itself was built by a huge Manitowoc 18000 crane. The eastern platform, supporting the towers, comprises 16 bridges. The platform for the Eastern Rail Yard was completed in October 2015, and the western part of the platform was completed the following year.

In 2013, Amtrak announced it would build a "tunnel box" through the project areas to reserve the space for a future rail right-of-way such as the proposed Gateway Project. Construction began September 2013 and took two years.

Financing and ownership
Projected to cost $25 billion upon its completion, Hudson Yards is one of the most expensive real estate developments ever built in the United States, and the largest private development in the country's history. Under the terms of their agreement with Oxford, Related retains a 60 percent stake in the complex. Related is unusual among real estate firms in that it develops and subsequently retains ownership of rental buildings it constructs, meaning it has a large portfolio of affordable rental properties that provide consistent income. Initial funding came exclusively from Related and partner Goldman Sachs. After Goldman exited this arrangement, Related and its new partner, Oxford, secured a number of capital sources. These include conventional lenders, such as Wells Fargo, foreign investors through the EB-5 program, and a debt raise on the Tel Aviv Stock Exchange. $600 million of the project's financing has come from EB-5, making it the project to receive the most funding from the program. Other lenders include The Children's Investment Fund Foundation, Deutsche Bank, and Allianz. As of September 2017, Related had raised about $18 billion in funds.

Related has also received or otherwise benefited from $6 billion in investments and tax breaks from the city in conjunction with Hudson Yards' construction. While The New York Times described the $6 billion as comprising numerous "tax breaks", a columnist for Crain's New York Business disputed this statement, saying, "There are two significant tax breaks which the New School totals at a little more than $1.36 billion", and that the rest of the investment was in infrastructure such as parks and the 7 Subway Extension. The $6 billion sum includes:
 $1.6 billion given by Empire State Development Corporation to Hudson Yards. The agency, which distributes funding through geographical districts, classified Hudson Yards as being in the same "economically troubled area" as the sparsely populated Central Park and low-income housing developments in Harlem, thereby qualifying the project for EB-5 funds.
 Funds for infrastructure projects that will serve the new development, including:
 $2.4 billion spent on the 7 Subway Extension project.
 $1.2 billion for Hudson Park and Boulevard.

An additional $1 billion was given to other developers who were building nearby projects.

Tenants
A number of companies have moved their headquarters or New York City office to Hudson Yards or rival developments. These include financial firms, law firms, and miscellaneous technology, fashion, and media companies. 10 Hudson Yards is occupied by Coach, the Boston Consulting Group, and Sidewalk Labs. 30 Hudson Yards would be occupied by Time Warner, DNB Bank, Wells Fargo Securities, and Facebook once it opens. 50 Hudson Yards would also be occupied by Facebook. 55 Hudson Yards would be occupied by at least three law firms (Boies, Schiller & Flexner; Cooley LLP; and Milbank, Tweed, Hadley & McCloy), as well as by Facebook, electronic trading platform MarketAxess and pharmaceutical company Intercept Pharmaceuticals. The city has enticed large tenants to Hudson Yards by making them eligible for discretionary tax credits once they add a certain number of jobs there.

Joe Patrice, writing for Above the Law, noted that with the move of Cooley LLP to 55 Hudson Yards from the Grace Building there was an "official trend" of law firms moving to the new office buildings on the far West Side. This move westward follows a trend from earlier in the 21st century, when firms began moving from parts of Midtown such as the Plaza District to Times Square and other areas with new office towers.

A number of financial firms have left offices in Midtown or the Financial District for the development. Following speculation that private equity company KKR might move to Hudson Yards, other finance-focused companies became more interested in the possibility of relocating there. KKR's long-time occupancy at the Solow Building in Midtown produced a similar effect, as Apollo Global Management, Och-Ziff Capital Management, and Silver Lake Partners had also taken space in the Midtown building. KKR ultimately decided to move to 30 Hudson Yards; Silver Lake announced it would leave the Solow Building for 55 Hudson Yards in 2017 after speculation it would do so. BlackRock, another major financial company, signed on as an anchor tenant at 50 Hudson Yards, where it is to occupy . Financial Times wrote that Hudson Yards "is the boldest expression of a new fashion in corporate real estate that buildings and 'space' should be potent weapons in a fight to recruit and retain talented young workers."

Equinox Fitness also operates the world's largest Equinox-branded gym at 35 Hudson Yards. The building also contains an Equinox-branded hotel. Related owns a majority stake in the fitness brand, purchased in 2005.

Design and reception

Architectural critiques
Kohn Pedersen Fox designed the site's master plan, as well as four individual buildings: 10, 30, and 55 Hudson Yards and the shopping center. Firms and individual architects working on distinct buildings did not meet to produce a uniform aesthetic or review the plans for individual buildings together. Two architects involved in the project, Thomas Woltz and Bill Pedersen, have respectively compared the relationship between the buildings to "mastodons, pineapples, sheds, swizzlesticks and bubble mats" and "elephants dancing".

Justin Davidson, writing for New York in 2018, referred to 10 Hudson Yards (then known as the "Coach Tower") as "taller, fatter, and greener" than historical New York City skyscrapers, despite more staid interiors with typical open floor plans and corresponding curtain wall. Davidson later compared Hudson Yards unfavorably to Manhattan West, writing that the Brookfield development "[...] feels like a corner of New York conceived with actual human beings in mind" while Hudson Yards has "[...] has aged from a shiny new space station to a disconsolate one".

New York Times architecture critic Michael Kimmelman called Hudson Yards a "gated community" catering to the upper-class, writing: "A relic of dated 2000s thinking, nearly devoid of urban design, it declines to blend into the city grid." The Guardian architecture and design critic, Oliver Wainwright, said that "the real shock is that it's quite so bad", and that the new buildings represented "ungainly lumps", with the logic of design "presenting a mostly blank frontage of service hatches and lift lobbies to the city".

Restaurants and amenities
In a review of the restaurant offerings at Hudson Yards written in anticipation of the complex opening to the public, Ryan Sutton criticized Related and Oxford for including only two establishments run by women. Further, Sutton criticized Related and Oxford for failing to provide opportunities for small, local operators to open in Hudson Yards, instead leasing to restaurateurs and organizations which had already experienced "great success". Sutton also criticized the lack of "vibrancy" at Hudson Yards, caused by a lack of street-level restaurants. Sutton noted the presence of several chain establishments, such as Sweetgreen and Think Coffee, at street-level in and near the complex, but wrote that "Fast casual isn't known for fostering communal dinnertime bonhomie". In his review, Sutton did express positive anticipation of Mercado Little Spain, a restaurant and food court which had not yet opened in 10 Hudson Yards at the time the piece was published by Eater. 

When Mercado Little Spain ultimately opened in 2019, Eater published a mixed review of its offerings written by Robert Sietsema. In a separate review by Sutton of the opened complex, published in 2019, the critic referred to Hudson Yards as "the worst place to eat fancy food in New York". In the 2019 review, which served as an introduction to Eaters individual reviews of restaurants in Hudson Yards, Sutton panned TAK Room, a restaurant by Thomas Keller, but offered praise for Kawi and Milos Wine Bar. In his full review of TAK Room, Sutton criticized its prices and the discrepancy between the cost of eating at the restaurant and his perception of the quality of the food and service. Pete Wells, in his review of the restaurant, echoed Sutton's criticisms. TAK Room closed in 2020 due to the COVID-19 pandemic.

The Equinox Hotel received a positive review from Vanity Fair. Samantha Lewis praised the hotel for its emphasis on providing guests with "blissful slumber". The hotel's restaurant, Electric Lemon, has received an "underwhelming" review from Pete Wells.

Public perception 
The Hudson Yards development has had mixed public approval. The New York Times questioned if New York City needed another "gated community," which alludes to the premium nature of the development, shops and condominium offerings. Bridget Read wrote for Curbed in 2022 that "the broad public benefit from the largest real-estate development in American history has not yet materialized". A study by The New School found that Hudson Yards had cost city residents an additional $2.2 billion in taxes, even though the project was supposed to have been self-financed.

Comedian Conner O'Malley released a video titled "Hudson Yards Video Game" which was perceived as critical of the project.

Resilience
Hudson Yards sits within Manhattan's 100-year floodplain, and the rail lines have previously been flooded despite preventative measures. Given that the bulk of the new structures would rise from an already elevated platform, the development is above the floodplain, and most mechanical systems are similarly raised. In addition, new elevator pits would be made waterproof.

Klaus Jacob, a professor at Columbia University, has stated approval of the project stems from the "shortsightedness of decision-making" by its developers and the city in the face of impending climate change. In his 2017 novel New York 2140, author Kim Stanley Robinson mentions the inundation of the neighborhood by rising waters.

Technology implementation
The rail yard development was designed to be technologically advanced, in that the owners would collect all sorts of data within the buildings using sensors and other data-collecting instruments. The innovations included:
 Air quality monitoring
 Heat mapping to track crowd size and energy usage
 Opt-in mobile apps to help collect data about users' health and activities
 Pedestrian and vehicular traffic monitoring
 Sensors collecting data about noise levels and energy and water usage
 Energy savings using a microgrid

New York University's Center for Urban Science and Progress designed the infrastructure with the developers of Hudson Yards. The technology was designed to be adaptable: updates to infrastructure would be performed as new technological advances are made.

See also
 Bridge Apartments, an apartment complex in New York City built over a 12-lane expressway
 Roppongi Hills, a similar large development in Tokyo

References

Further reading
 Arak, Joey. "Brookfield Properties Goes Splittsville" on Curbed.com (November 19, 2007)
 Chaban, Matt. "Scaling the Towers of Hudson Yards" in New York Observer (July 12, 2011)
 Davidson, Justin. "From 0 to 12 Million Square Feet" New York (October 7, 2012).
 Dobkin, Jake. "Checking In At Hudson Yards, Manhattan's Enormous New Luxury Neighborhood" in Gothamist (July 16, 2015
 "Reimagining the Far West Side". A 2004 proposal for the Hudson Yards area commissioned by magazine City Journal
 Samtani, Hiten. "Anatomy of a deal: Inside Related/Oxford’s unusual financing of Hudson Yards" in The Real Deal (August 16, 2013))

External links

 

Buildings developed by the Related Companies
Multi-building developments in New York City
Proposed buildings and structures in New York City
Proposed skyscrapers in the United States